The Electronic Signatures in Global and National Commerce Act  (ESIGN) is a United States federal law passed by the U.S. Congress to facilitate the use of electronic records and electronic signatures in interstate and foreign commerce by ensuring the validity and legal effect of contracts entered into electronically.

Although every state has at least one law pertaining to electronic signatures, it is the federal law that lays out the guidelines for interstate commerce. The general intent of the ESIGN Act is spelled out in the first section (101.a), that a contract or signature “may not be denied legal effect, validity, or enforceability solely because it is in electronic form”. This simple statement provides that electronic signatures and records are just as good as their paper equivalents, and therefore subject to the same legal scrutiny of authenticity that applies to paper documents.

Sections from the ESIGN Act

Definitions
Sec 106 of the ESIGN Act defines:

General intent

Consumer disclosure
Section 101 of the ESIGN Act, sub-section (b), preserves the rights of individuals to NOT USE electronic signatures. Here the law provides that individuals reserve the right to use a paper signature. Sub-section (c) is in direct support of (b) by requiring a "Consumer Disclosure" that the signatory has consented to use an electronic format.
Section 101(c)(1)(C) states that the consumer also "consent electronically, in a manner that reasonably demonstrates that the consumer can access information in the electronic form that will be used to provide the information that is the subject of the consent".

The consumer must provide affirmative consent, meaning that it cannot be assumed that a consumer has given consent simply because he/she has not chosen the option to deny consent, or has not responded to an option to grant consent.

The first public implementation of Section 106 of the ESIGN Act came nine months prior to its approval, when in October 1999, Eric Solis, Founder and CEO of SaveDaily.com Inc., a web-based micro-investing solution and creator of the eSolis Brokerage Account, pioneered the use of an electronic signature to establish paperless brokerage accounts. Solis overcame the requirements of section 101(c)(1)(C) by causing the consumer to agree in advance via Consumer Disclosures that all communications, including signatures would be executed and delivered electronically.

Retention of contracts and records
Section 101(d) provides that if a law requires that a business retain a record of a transaction, the business satisfies the requirement by retaining an electronic record, as long as the record 1) "accurately reflects" the substance of the original record in an unalterable format, 2) is "accessible" to people who are entitled to access it, 3) is "in a form that is capable of being accurately reproduced for later reference, whether by transmission, printing or otherwise", and 4) is retained for the legally required period of time.

See also
 Title 21 CFR Part 11
 Uniform Electronic Transactions Act
 eIDAS

References

External links 
 Electronic Signatures in Global and National Commerce Act (PDF/details) as amended in the GPO Statute Compilations collection
 The eSign effect .Archive.org copy
 Consumer Consent Pvirginia L. Fowlerrovision

United States contract law
United States federal commerce legislation
Acts of the 106th United States Congress
Cryptography law
Computer law
E-commerce in the United States
Signature